Terry Scott Taylor (born May 24, 1950) is an American songwriter, record producer, writer and founding member of the bands Daniel Amos and The Swirling Eddies (credited as Camarillo Eddy). Taylor is also a member of the roots and alternative music group, Lost Dogs. He is currently based in San Jose, California, U.S.

Taylor is highly regarded for his songwriting skills. These often include allusions to and reworkings of material ranging from Elizabethan poets to modern authors. Foremost among Taylor's influences is William Blake. The Daniel Amos album title Fearful Symmetry was drawn from Blake's poem "The Tyger," and numerous songs across The Alarma! Chronicles series of albums have Blake-inspired references. Some other poets who have influenced Taylor's work are T. S. Eliot and Christina Rossetti. Eliot's poetry inspired the song "Hollow Man" from the Doppelgänger album. "Where Dreams Come True" from Taylor's solo album, A Briefing for the Ascent, draws heavily from Rosetti's poem "Echo".

The inspiration for many Daniel Amos and Taylor songs from the mid-1980s can be found in the book Behold, This Dreamer: Of Reverie, Night, Sleep, Dream, Love-Dreams, Nightmare, Death. This book, compiled by Walter de la Mare and published in 1939, contains poems and essays that appear in Taylor's songwriting. De la Mare is thanked in the liner notes of the final installment of The Alarma! Chronicles, Fearful Symmetry. References to contemporary authors also appear in Taylor's songs. One example is the song "Shape of Air" from the LP Darn Floor-Big Bite. The song explores the mystical musings of Annie Dillard found in her Pulitzer prize-winning book, Pilgrim at Tinker Creek. The album is also heavily inspired by the works of Czesław Miłosz. This is especially evident in songs like "The Unattainable Earth" (which was named after one of Miłosz' books), "Safety Net", "Pictures of the Gone World", "Divine Instant", and "Half Light, Epoch, and Phase". On Taylor's 1998 release, John Wayne, he credits more influences; Flannery O'Connor, Dennis Prager and Frederick Buechner.

During the 1990s and into the new millennium, Taylor's songwriting for the Lost Dogs and on other projects turned away from more esoteric themes. The songs crafted during this phase of Taylor's career marked a shift toward "Americana" and, in some ways, a return to the country music sound of Daniel Amos in the early 1970s. The primary vehicle for this phase of Taylor's songwriting career is the Lost Dogs, with a number of noteworthy solo projects. The Lost Dogs began in 1991 as a one-time collaboration between vocalists and songwriters from four different bands at the behest of their label at that time. Taylor, Gene Eugene (of Adam Again), Derri Daugherty (of The Choir), and Michael Roe (of The 77s) have released several eclectic albums of traditional American music (country, folk, blues, rock) over the last decade.

Career
After a number of years performing with local California bands and folk trios like Good Shepherd, Judge Rainbow and the Prophetic Trumpets, The Cardboard Scheme, and The Scarlet Staircase, Taylor formed Jubal's Last Band with Steve Baxter, Kenny Paxton, and Chuck Starnes in 1972. In 1974, the band recorded a demo tape together to shop around to record labels. Later that year, the band lost Paxton and Starnes, and added bassist Marty Dieckmeyer and guitarist Jerry Chamberlain to the line-up.

Sometime in the middle of 1975, Jubal's Last Band (minus Baxter) auditioned for Maranatha! Music and Calvary Chapel in hopes of signing a recording and performance contract. Another band at the meeting, led by Darrell Mansfield, had a similar name: Jubal. The two bands decided to change their names to avoid confusion. Mansfield renamed his band Gentle Faith, and Jubal's Last Band became Daniel Amos. Daniel Amos succeeded in landing a recording and performance contract, and quickly recorded their first song for the label, Taylor's "Ain't Gonna Fight It" featuring ace sessionplayer Michael Omartian (Steely Dan) on Rhodes. A full album, produced by Al Perkins, followed. Taylor and the members of Daniel Amos went on to record numerous albums and change musical styles with nearly every one of them, including the four part Alarma! Chronicles series in the 1980s.

In 1986, Taylor released his first solo album, Knowledge & Innocence, which included songs inspired by the death of his grandfather and the miscarriage of his and his wife's first child. The following year, Taylor released his second solo album, A Briefing for the Ascent, this time inspired by the loss of his grandmother. That year, Taylor also became the production director for Frontline Records and went on to produce many of the label's releases.

In the early 1990s, Taylor teamed up with Adam Again's Gene Eugene, The Choir's Derri Daugherty and The 77s' Mike Roe to form the alt-country/roots band, Lost Dogs. Although it began as a "one time" arrangement, the band soon took on a life of its own and has continued to tour and make albums to this day.

In 1996, he wrote and performed the soundtrack for Doug TenNapel's The Neverhood and Skullmonkeys.

In 1997, Taylor became the head of West Coast A&R for the Killen Music Group (KMG Records), a Nashville-based record label. The following year Taylor's third solo album, John Wayne, was released at the Cornerstone Festival. In 1999, a number of artists and fans of Taylor's came together to create When Worlds Collide: A Tribute to Daniel Amos. The album contained nearly 20 songs written by Taylor and performed by other artists, including The 77s, Randy Stonehill, Phil Madeira, Starflyer59, Jimmy Abegg, Larry Norman, The Throes and others. The project was completed and released in the summer of 2000, along with Taylor's fourth solo project, the acoustic Avocado Faultline. Two years later, Taylor returned with an EP entitled, LITTLE, big.

In 2005, Taylor composed the soundtrack to another TenNapel cartoon series (this time, for the Nickelodeon network) called Catscratch. He adapted the music from the famous children's song "Bingo" for use, with new lyrics by Taylor, as the opening theme song for the Cartoon Network animated television series Camp Lazlo.

Taylor created the fictional character, Dr. Edward Daniel Taylor, who first appeared in a 1990 best of compilation by Frontline Records of music by Daniel Amos and The Swirling Eddies. The character was an amalgamation of televangelists along the lines of Robert Tilton, Benny Hinn and Oral Roberts and acted as the emcee for segments of his ministry's Prickly Heat Telethon of Love pledge event which appeared as interludes between songs. The character made subsequent appearances including 2003's The Prickly Heat Radio Players, and 2004's limited edition EP, The Perfectly Frank True Story of Christmas and a very brief appearance on the Lost Dogs' 2007 Christmas album, We Like to Have Christmas, on which he can be heard introducing the band as "The Lost Hogs".

Taylor produced a number of albums over the years with singer/songwriter Randy Stonehill, including Equator (which included the Stonehill concert favorite "Shut De Do"), the dreamy Wonderama, and the 2001 Children's album Uncle Stonehill's Hat, which also featured Taylor's daughter Noelle contributing her voice to the story. Throughout his entire career, Taylor has produced albums for countless bands and artists including Randy Stonehill, Riki Michele, Tom Howard, The Altar Boys, Crystal Lewis and Wild Blue Yonder, Jacob's Trouble, Scaterd Few, Deliverance, Mercy River, Starflyer 59's Leave Here a Stranger, Fine China's You Make Me Hate Music, Mortal, Poor Old Lu, Tourniquet, Rich Young Ruler, Derri Daugherty, an assortment of children's records including the MegaMouth series and the Harry Whodunit? series. He also wrote and produced a tribute to surf music entitled Surfonic Water Revival, which featured performances by Phil Keaggy, Smalltown Poets, Chuck Girard, Paul Johnson, Havalina Rail Co., Rick Altizer, Plumb, The Supertones, All Star United, Skillet, Silage, Rebecca St. James, The Insyderz, and others.

Knowledge & Innocence

Knowledge & Innocence, released in 1986 as Terry Scott Taylor's first solo album, is an introspective album dedicated to Taylor's grandfather. Lyrically referencing the 1789 poetry collection Songs of Innocence by William Blake, references found also in Taylor's other work such as the Daniel Amos band album Fearful Symmetry. "Song of Innocence", a duet with Randy Stonehill singing, in Taylor's words, a breathy "soulful and sweet" vocal, was released as a single.

Influence
Numerous people have named Taylor and Daniel Amos as an influence over the years including Jonathan Coulton.

Discography

Solo
 Knowledge & Innocence (1986)
 A Briefing for the Ascent (1987)
 Neverhood Songs (1996)
 John Wayne (1998)
 Avocado Faultline (2000)
 LITTLE, big (2002)
 All Day Sing and Dinner on the Ground (with Michael Roe, 2002)
 Songs for the Day After Christmas
 Imaginarium: Songs from the Neverhood (2004)
 Random Acts and Hodgepodge (2008)
 An Intimate Evening with Terry Scott Taylor (2009)
 Swine Before Pearl, Vol.1: Standard & Deluxe Editions (2010)
 Swine Before Pearl, Vol. 2: Madness and Blindness and Astonishment of the Heart (2011)
 The Return to The Neverhood (2012)
 The Music of Armikrog (2015)
This Beautiful Mystery (2022)

With Daniel Amos
 Daniel Amos (1976)
 Shotgun Angel (1977)
 Horrendous Disc, (1978)
 ¡Alarma! (1981)
 Doppelgänger (1983)
 Vox Humana (1984)
 Fearful Symmetry (1986)
 The Revelation (1986)
 Darn Floor-Big Bite (1987)
 Live Bootleg '82 (1990)
 Kalhoun (1991)
 MotorCycle (1993)
 BibleLand (1994)
 Preachers From Outer Space! (1994)
 Songs of the Heart (1995)
 Mr Buechner's Dream (2001)
 Daniel Amos Live in Anaheim 1985 (2003 DVD)
 The Making of Mr. Buechner's Dream (2005 DVD)
 Instruction Through Film (2007 DVD)
 Dig Here Said the Angel (2013)

With the Swirling Eddies
 Let's Spin! (1988)
 Spittle and Phleghm (1989, video)
 Outdoor Elvis (1989)
 Zoom Daddy (1994)
 The Berry Vest of The Swirling Eddies (1995)
 Sacred Cows (1996)
 The midget, the speck and the molecule (2007)

With the Lost Dogs
 Scenic Routes (1992)
 Little Red Riding Hood (1993)
 The Green Room Serenade, Part One (1996)
 Gift Horse (1999)
 Real Men Cry (2001)
 The Green Room Serenade, Part Tour (2002, live album)
 Nazarene Crying Towel (2003)
 The Lost Dogs... Via Chicago (2003)
 MUTT (2004)
 Island Dreams (2005)
 The Lost Cabin and the Mystery Trees (2006)
 Via Chicago (All We Left Unsaid) (2006)
 We Like To Have Christmas (2007)
 Old Angel (2010)

With the Rapsures
 Gospel Rap (1985)
 OT Rap (1987)
 Loud, Proud and Born Again (1990)

Other appearances
 Surfonic Water Revival (Various Artists compilation, 2000)
 City on a Hill: It's Christmas Time (Various Artists compilation, 2002)
 Making God Smile: A Tribute to Beach Boy Brian Wilson (Various Artists compilation, 2002)
 Come As a Child Or Not at All (Compilation memorial with Theo Obrastoff, 2003)

References

External links
 www.TheLostDogs.com
 www.DanielAmos.com
 Terry Scott Taylor at MySpace.com
 
 Rapsures

1950 births
Living people
Record producers from California
American rock singers
American rock guitarists
American male guitarists
Singer-songwriters from California
American performers of Christian music
Stunt Records artists
Guitarists from California
20th-century American guitarists
The Swirling Eddies members
Lost Dogs members
Daniel Amos members
20th-century American male musicians
American male singer-songwriters